"I evighet" ("For eternity")  was the  entry in the Eurovision Song Contest 1996, performed in Norwegian by Elisabeth Andreassen. The song reached number 13 on the chart in Norway. In Israel it peaked on number 1.

It was performed twelfth on the night, following 's Maarja-Liis Ilus and Ivo Linna with "Kaelakee hääl" and preceding 's Dan Ar Braz & L'Héritage des Celtes with "Diwanit Bugale". At the close of voting, it had received 114 points, placing 2nd in a field of 23.

"I evighet" was translated into Swedish, with the lyrics being co-written by Torhild Nigar, Elisabeth Andreassen and Åsa Jinder and the title remaining the same. An English-language release (titled "Eternity") was also made.

In 1998, the song was re-written in German as "Wir sind dabei", as part of the hundredth anniversary celebrations for the German sporting federation. The re-titled "Wir sind dabei" was adopted as the official song of this celebration, held in Munich, with Andreassen performing it frequently and in a number of different language versions. This version is unique among the translations as it focuses on the positive aspects of sport, rather than the original theme of the eternity of love.

It was succeeded as Norwegian representative at the 1997 contest by Tor Endresen with "San Francisco".

Charts

References

Elisabeth Andreassen songs
Eurovision songs of 1996
Eurovision songs of Norway
Sporting songs
1996 songs
Polydor Records singles
1996 singles
Number-one singles in Israel